Appling may refer to:

Places 
Appling, Georgia
Appling County, Georgia

People 
Daniel Appling (1787–1817), officer in the United States Army
Dean R. Appling, American biochemist
Howell Appling Jr. (1919–2002), American businessman and Republican politician
Keith Appling (born 1992), American basketball player
Luke Appling (1907–1991), American baseball player
Peter C. Appling (1822–1908), member of the California State Assembly (1869–1871)

Other 
USS Appling (APA-58), a ship